Kevin Csoboth (born 20 June 2000) is a Hungarian professional footballer who plays as a forward for Hungarian side Újpest.

Club career
On 14 February 2022, Csoboth joined Szeged-Csanád on loan until the end of the season.

Career statistics

Club

References

External links

2000 births
Living people
Sportspeople from Pécs
Hungarian footballers
Hungary youth international footballers
Association football forwards
Ferencvárosi TC footballers
S.L. Benfica B players
Fehérvár FC players
Szeged-Csanád Grosics Akadémia footballers
Liga Portugal 2 players
Nemzeti Bajnokság I players
Nemzeti Bajnokság II players
Expatriate footballers in Portugal
Hungarian expatriate footballers
Hungarian expatriate sportspeople in Portugal
21st-century Hungarian people
Újpest FC players